The Santa Cruz lava lizard (Microlophus indefatigabilis) is a species of lava lizard endemic to the Galapagos island of Santa Cruz.

Description 
They are identifiable by a brown body with scattered black and white blotches with a distinctive red and black throat and a black chest. Females have a more uniform brown body, a bright orange face, and a black mark at shoulder level. The species is able to shed its tail without mortal injury. The

Sexual dimorphism 
Harems are kept, and are competed for by males using a pushup ritual to avoid physical injury. Males have a higher stamina and greater body size compared to the female.

Distribution 
Endemic to Santa Cruz Island, it is found within volcanic rock areas, dry shrublands, dry grasslands, deciduous forests, and urban areas, and prefers shaded locations.

References

Microlophus
Endemic reptiles of the Galápagos Islands
Reptiles of Ecuador
Reptiles described in 1890
Taxa named by Georg Baur